General San Martín is a city and the capital of the Albardón Department of San Juan Province, Argentina.

References 

Populated places in San Juan Province, Argentina
Populated places established in 1866
1866 establishments in Argentina